Silver Lake is a town that existed near the Tonopah and Tidewater Railroad, six miles north of Baker, in the Mojave Desert of San Bernardino County, California.

When the railroad ceased to operate in 1940, the town was abandoned. It is now mostly collapsed buildings.

References

Ghost towns in California
Former settlements in San Bernardino County, California
Populated places in the Mojave Desert